Hart's Local Grocers was an independent grocery store managed by Rochester Local Capital LLC. It was located in the East End Neighborhood in Rochester, NY.

History and Store Description
The store was named after Hart's Groceries, which had over 100 locations in and around the city Rochester, NY by the 1920s. They were considered one of the first grocer to use store-brand labels and were also the first self-service grocery market. Hart's has attracted considerable interest in Downtown Rochester since its opening was announced in January 2014. This is primarily due to downtown Rochester not having a full-services grocery since the closing of Midtown Market formerly Wegmans Midtown in 2002. The store's opening coincided with ongoing efforts to redevelop the former Midtown Plaza site on Main Street and the arrival in the downtown area of thousands of new residents in apartments and condominiums.

The Mayor of Rochester, NY Lovely Warren, was quoted saying "For too long, downtown has been a food desert, our East End is already vibrant and the addition of will add to the vitality of the neighborhood". The 20,000-square-foot store carried local produce, dairy, meats and baked goods and a wide variety of prepared foods, offering online ordering and online shopping. The grocery, was independently owned and financed in part through a private investor group. The store was next to the Little Theatre.

On March 11, 2019, it was announced that Hart's would close after five years in business on March 24, 2019 due to declining sales and an inability to find a new owner.

References

External links

 

Defunct supermarkets of the United States
Companies based in Rochester, New York
2014 establishments in New York (state)
2019 disestablishments in New York (state)
Retail companies established in 2014
Retail companies disestablished in 2019